3C 9 is a lobe-dominated quasar located in the constellation Pisces.

In 1965, it was the most distant object discovered at the time of discovery. This was the first object with a redshift in excess of 2.

References

External links
 Wikisky image of 3C 9
 Image of 3C 9 by PanSTARRS

Quasars
009
Pisces (constellation)
2817473